Ivan Perez (born 17 December 2000 in Tenerife) is a Spanish professional squash player. As of March 2022, he was ranked number 84 in the world.

References

2000 births
Living people
Spanish male squash players